Dr. Hadas Malada-Matzri (born 1984) is the first Ethiopian Israeli female doctor in the Israel Defense Forces.    
 
Malada-Matzri was born in Ethiopia and emigrated to Israel in 1988 in Operation Solomon. At that time, she suffered from malnutrition and malaria that she had contracted in a Sudan refugee camp. She spent her first six months in Israel in rehabilitation and has said in interviews that this experience is what led her to become a doctor.

She earned a medical degree from Ben Gurion University of the Negev and served for five years as a medical officer with the rank of captain in the Israel Defense Forces.  

She is an activist against racism and works to promote the full inclusion of Ethiopian children in educational and social opportunities. Malada-Matzri helped found the Ethiopian Israeli Health Promotion Forum, a group of over 400 doctors, nurses, and other health professionals from Ethiopian-Israeli backgrounds.

References 

1984 births
Living people
Ben-Gurion University of the Negev alumni
Ethiopian emigrants to Israel
Israeli military doctors
Israeli women physicians
Jewish Israeli anti-racism activists